ITEP is an abbreviation that may mean:
 Improved Turbine Engine Program, a U.S. Army program to develop a new higher output engine for Army helicopters.
 International Test of English Proficiency
 Institute for Theoretical and Experimental Physics
 Institute on Taxation and Economic Policy, a non-profit, non-partisan think tank that works on state and federal tax policy issues.